Ahmed Iqbal (born 28 March 1989) is a Pakistani cricketer. He made his first-class debut for Karachi Whites in the 2007–08 Quaid-e-Azam Trophy on 13 December 2007.

References

External links
 

1989 births
Living people
Pakistani cricketers
Place of birth missing (living people)
Karachi Blues cricketers
Karachi Whites cricketers